Louise Ambjörg Svalastog Spellerberg (born 1 October 1982) is a Danish handball player.

She was a member of the Danish national team, and where participated at the 2011 World Women's Handball Championship in Brazil.

Personal
She was married to fellow handball player Bo Spellerberg.

References

1982 births
Living people
People from Kolding
Danish female handball players
Sportspeople from the Region of Southern Denmark